Arthur James Bisch (November 10, 1926 – July 6, 1958) was an American racecar driver.  Bisch died two days after sustaining head and chest injuries when his Champ Car smashed into the guardrail and rolled over twice at Lakewood Speedway in July 1958.  A month earlier, he had captured his first Champ Car win at the Milwaukee Mile.

Complete USAC Championship Car results

Indianapolis 500 results

Complete Formula One World Championship results
(key)

References

External links
 

1926 births
1958 deaths
Sportspeople from Mesa, Arizona
Racing drivers from Mesa, Arizona
Racing drivers from Arizona
Indianapolis 500 drivers
Racing drivers who died while racing
Sports deaths in Georgia (U.S. state)